Dorogobuzh is a historic town and the administrative center of Dorogobuzhsky District in Smolensk Oblast, Russia, straddling the Dnieper River and located  east of Smolensk, the administrative center of the oblast. Population:

Climate
Dorogobuzh has a warm-summer humid continental climate (Dfb in the Köppen climate classification).

History

First mentioned in 1150, it was established as a fortress defending eastern approaches to Smolensk. It was located in the Principality of Smolensk, which in 1404 became part of Lithuania. It passed to the Grand Duchy of Moscow after the Battle of Vedrosha in 1500. In 1508, Vasily III sent Italian masters to build a wooden fort there.

During the Time of Troubles, Dorogobuzh passed between Lithuania and various Muscovite factions several times, and was ravaged, with its population reduced to ten people in 1614. It was captured by Russia in 1613, and then re-captured by Polish Prince Władysław IV Vasa in 1617. Within the Polish–Lithuanian Commonwealth, it was part of the Smolensk Voivodeship. During the Smolensk War, in 1632, it was besieged and captured by Russia, however, it was restored to the Polish–Lithuanian Commonwealth by the Treaty of Polyanovka in 1634. In 1667, it passed to Russia.

During the Napoleonic Wars, it was captured by French troops in August 1812, and re-captured by Russia in October 1812. In the late 19th century, the town held an annual fair for grain, horses and cattle.

Dorogobuzh was occupied by the German Army during World War II first from October 5, 1941 to February 15, 1942 (when it was liberated by three partisan detachments and some Soviet troops), then again from June 7, 1942 to September 1, 1943. In 1942, the Germans established a forced labour camp in the town.

Administrative and municipal status
Within the framework of administrative divisions, Dorogobuzh serves as the administrative center of Dorogobuzhsky District. As an administrative division, it is incorporated within Dorogobuzhsky District as Dorogobuzhskoye Urban Settlement. As a municipal division, this administrative unit also has urban settlement status and is a part of Dorogobuzhsky Municipal District.

References

Notes

Sources

External links

Official website of Dorogobuzh 
Dorogobuzh Business Directory 
Mojgorod.ru. Entry on Dorogobuzh 

Cities and towns in Smolensk Oblast
Smolensk Voivodeship
Dorogobuzhsky Uyezd
Populated places on the Dnieper in Russia